Kihikihi, a small town located in the Waikato region of the North Island of New Zealand, serves as a satellite community of Te Awamutu, five kilometres to the north, and lies 35 kilometres south of Hamilton. The 2018 New Zealand census recorded a population of 2,808 people The main reason for the large increase since 2013 is the construction of a large number of new dwellings.

The town's outer rim has merged with the expanding rim of Te Awamutu, rendering the boundary between the two towns difficult to perceive.

Kihikihi is a Māori-language word meaning "cicada"; the name imitates the sound made by the insect.
A large statue of a cicada stands at the northern entrance to the town.

Kihikihi's multi-purpose sports domain hosts national and international equestrian events such as the FEI Eventing World Cup.

The town is also home to the historic Kihikihi Polo Club, founded in 1892 by the Kay family.

History  
KIhikihi in the 19th century was described as a "border settlement" or a "frontier town" by James Cowan, ruined in the 1880s by the "Great Wet Peace" with the partition of the King Country and land-buying from Māori .

Demographics

Kihikihi had a population of 2,808 at the 2018 New Zealand census, an increase of 336 people (13.6%) since the 2013 census, and an increase of 447 people (18.9%) since the 2006 census. There were 999 households, comprising 1,389 males and 1,422 females, giving a sex ratio of 0.98 males per female, with 585 people (20.8%) aged under 15 years, 531 (18.9%) aged 15 to 29, 1,260 (44.9%) aged 30 to 64, and 432 (15.4%) aged 65 or older.

Ethnicities were 78.8% European/Pākehā, 29.8% Māori, 2.5% Pacific peoples, 2.6% Asian, and 1.5% other ethnicities. People may identify with more than one ethnicity.

The percentage of people born overseas was 13.4, compared with 27.1% nationally.

Although some people chose not to answer the census's question about religious affiliation, 52.6% had no religion, 32.4% were Christian, 2.6% had Māori religious beliefs, 0.7% were Hindu, 0.5% were Buddhist and 1.7% had other religions.

Of those at least 15 years old, 273 (12.3%) people had a bachelor's or higher degree, and 555 (25.0%) people had no formal qualifications. 315 people (14.2%) earned over $70,000 compared to 17.2% nationally. The employment status of those at least 15 was that 1,170 (52.6%) people were employed full-time, 300 (13.5%) were part-time, and 96 (4.3%) were unemployed.

People 
John Rochford (1832–1893) died in the Star Hotel and is buried in the Kihikihi Cemetery near the Kihikihi Primary school. He was one of the first to survey the routes of today's railways in both the North and South Islands. A reserve in Kihikhi commemorates the name of John Rochford.

Rewi Maniapoto (1807–1894) lived in Kihikihi, on the site of the Rewi Maniapoto Reserve and the memorial. Kihikihi stood at the core of the productive farm-lands that Maori developed in the 1850s with the help of CMS missionaries. The district supplied food to new settlers in Auckland for a brief period. The area became the heartland of anti-government Maori in 1863, during the New Zealand Wars.

Archaeological sites 
20 archaeological sites have been identified in the town, 9 of which are listed by Heritage New Zealand -
 c1868 Alpha Hotel
 1879 Major Jackson's House
 1881 Christ Church (Anglican)
 1883 Star Hotel
 1894 Rewi Maniapoto Memorial and Reserve
 1904 Town Hall
 1907 Constable's House and Police Station
 1920 World War One Memorial
 94 Lyon St
Under the Reserves Act 1977, a management plan for some of the historic area was drawn up for Waipa District Council.

Education

It opened in 1873, and moved to its current site in 1884. It was destroyed by fire in 1938, and rebuilt in 1952.

Transport 
Kihikihi is on SH3. An infrequent bus service operated by GoBus links it to Te Awamutu and Hamilton. The Kihikihi Trail cycleway to Te Awamutu opened in 2017.

References

Populated places in Waikato
Waipa District